Toka is a sand cay in the Pukapuka atoll of the Cook Islands. The cay is to the west of the atoll, separated from the island of Motu Kotawa by a reef. It is regulated by the village of Yato, and is extremely dangerous to land on.

References

Pukapuka